Vilém Kurz (23 December 1872 – 25 May 1945) was a Czech pianist and renowned piano teacher.

Career
Kurz was born in Německý Brod, Bohemia in 1872.  He became a professor at the State Conservatory in Lviv and  Vienna,  and Prague Conservatory. 

His students included his daughter Ilona Štěpánová-Kurzová, Rudolf Firkušný, Eduard Steuermann, Artur Rodziński, Břetislav Bakala, Pavel Štěpán, Stanislav Heller, František Maxián, Gidéon Klein, Rafael Schächter, Viktorie Švihlíková, Stefania Turkewich, Ilja Hurník, Pavel Šivic, Drahomir Toman, Zdeněk Jílek and Matusja Blum. 

His teaching methods were largely based on those of Theodor Leschetizky and his pupils he met during the time he taught in Lviv. Later they were further developed by his daughter Ilona Štěpánová-Kurzová.

He died in Prague in 1945.

Antonin Dvořák's Piano Concerto in G minor 
Kurz is known for his reworking of the solo part of Antonín Dvořák's Piano Concerto in G minor, Op. 33, which was originally composed in 1876. For more than a decade after the concerto's first performance, it suffered from neglect and critical disdain. A common remark for many years was that the piano part was written "as if for two right hands."

While he was in his 20s, Kurz undertook a revision of the solo part, and it is this version that he frequently performed. Since that time, the original and the Kurz versions have been printed together in Otakar Šourek's critical edition of the score, one beneath the other, so that the soloist can choose which version to perform. The Kurz version has become a part of the standard piano repertoire. Dvořák's original orchestral material is not affected by the soloist's choice. In 1919 Ilona Kurzová played the first performance of the Kurz version of the concerto, conducted by Václav Talich. This revision was later adopted and recorded by Rudolf Firkušný, who in the 1950s also introduced a few cuts to the first and third movements. In the 1970s he abandoned all revisions in favour of the original version by Dvořák.

Supraphon, the Czech recording company, issued a compact disc on which Ivan Moravec plays the Kurz version, with the Czech Philharmonic conducted by Jiří Bělohlávek, while Radoslav Kvapil plays the composer's original score, with the Brno Philharmonic Orchestra under František Jílek.

See also
 Rafael Schächter

References 

 Dr. Zdeňka Böhmová-Zahradníčková: Vilém Kurz, SNKL n.p. Praha 1954

Gallery

Czech classical pianists
20th-century classical pianists
Piano pedagogues
Czech expatriates in Austria
Musicians from Havlíčkův Brod
1872 births
1945 deaths
Academic staff of the Prague Conservatory
Academic staff of Lviv Conservatory
Burials at Vyšehrad Cemetery
Academic staff of Brno Conservatory